Hoseynabad-e Sargorij (also Romanized as Ḩoseynābād-e Sargorīj; also known as Ḩoseynābād) is a village in Mehruiyeh Rural District, in the Central District of Faryab County, Kerman Province, Iran. At the 2006 census, its population was 168, in 43 families.

References 

Populated places in Faryab County